Diana Huffaker FIEEE, FOSA is a physicist working in compound semiconductors optical devices. She is the current Sêr Cymru Chair in Advanced Engineering and Materials and Science Director of the Institute of Compound Semiconductors is based within Cardiff University. Her work includes compound semiconductor epitaxy, lasers, solar cells, optoelectronic devices, plasmonics, and Quantum dot and nanostructured materials.

Research and career 

Prior to moving to Cardiff University in 2015, Huffaker was Professor in Electrical Engineering and Director of the Integrated Nanomaterials Laboratory at the University of California, Los Angeles (UCLA).

Highly cited papers 

 Huffaker, D. L., Deppe, D. G., Kumar, K., & Rogers, T. J. (1994). Native-oxide defined ring contact for low threshold vertical-cavity lasers. Applied Physics Letters, 65(1), 97–99. doi:10.1063/1.113087
 Huffaker, D. L., & Deppe, D. G. (1998). Electroluminescence efficiency of 1.3 μm wavelength InGaAs/GaAs quantum dots. Applied Physics Letters, 73(4), 520–522. doi:10.1063/1.121920
 Huffaker, D. L., Park, G., Zou, Z., Shchekin, O. B., & Deppe, D. G. (1998). 1.3 μm room-temperature GaAs-based quantum-dot laser. Applied Physics Letters, 73(18), 2564–2566. doi:10.1063/1.122534
 Gyoungwon Park, Shchekin, O. B., Huffaker, D. L., & Deppe, D. G. (2000). Low-threshold oxide-confined 1.3-μm quantum-dot laser. IEEE Photonics Technology Letters, 12(3), 230–232. doi:10.1109/68.826897
 Huang, S. H., Balakrishnan, G., Khoshakhlagh, A., Jallipalli, A., Dawson, L. R., & Huffaker, D. L. (2006). Strain relief by periodic misfit arrays for low defect density GaSb on GaAs. Applied Physics Letters, 88(13), 131911. doi:10.1063/1.2172742
 Laghumavarapu, R. B., Moscho, A., Khoshakhlagh, A., El-Emawy, M., Lester, L. F., & Huffaker, D. L. (2007). GaSb/GaAs type II quantum dot solar cells for enhanced infrared spectral response. Applied Physics Letters, 90(17), 173125. doi:10.1063/1.2734492

Awards and honours

The Optical Society, Fellow, 2014
SPIE, Nanoengineering Pioneer Award, 2010
 Creative Awards, Most Valuable Patent, 2009
 DoD, National Security Science and Engineering Faculty Fellow (NSSEFF), 2008
 IEEE, Fellow, 2008
 Alexander Von Humboldt Fellowship, 2004

External links 
 Diana Huffaker: Home Page, Department of Physics and Astronomy, Cardiff University 
 Diana Huffaker: Home Page, Electrical and Computer Engineering, UCLA

References 

Living people
Academics of Cardiff University
Women physicists
Year of birth missing (living people)
Women in optics